Mohammad Eqlakh (born 10 April 1996) is a Zimbabwean cricketer. He made his first-class debut for Mountaineers in the 2017–18 Logan Cup on 6 November 2017. Later in the same month, in his second match, he scored his maiden first-class century, with 153 not out against the Rising Stars.

He made his List A debut for Mountaineers in the 2017–18 Pro50 Championship on 1 December 2017.

References

External links
 

1996 births
Living people
Zimbabwean cricketers
Place of birth missing (living people)
Mountaineers cricketers